Pierre Moreau (born December 12, 1957 in Vercheres, Quebec) is a lawyer and a politician in the Canadian province of Quebec.

Pierre Moreau was the Liberal MNA for the riding of  Marguerite-D'Youville in the National Assembly of Quebec from 2003 to 2007. He ran again in 2008 in the nearby electorate of Châteauguay, and entered Cabinet.

Moreau ran unsuccessfully for the leadership of the Quebec Liberal Party in 2013, coming second to Philippe Couillard. On April 7, 2014, Pierre Moreau was re-elected for a third consecutive term in Châteauguay in an election where the Liberals formed a majority government. On April 23, 2014, Philippe Couillard named him Minister of Municipal Affairs and Land Occupancy and Minister responsible for the Montérégie region.

Since February 2019, he is Managing Partner of the Bélanger Sauvé law firm.

Biography
Born in Verchères on December 12, 1957, Pierre Moreau obtained a Bachelor of Civil Law from Laval University in 1980 and was admitted to the École du Barreau du Québec in 1981. He spent 22 years specializing in municipal and administrative law in a private practice in Montreal. He also shared his expertise by teaching at the École du Barreau du Québec from 1996 to 2002.

He first entered the political arena by running for the Liberal Party of Quebec in October 2002. Elected as MNA for Marguerite-d’Youville on April 14, 2003, he successively served as parliamentary assistant to the Minister of Justice and Attorney General, as assistant Government House Leader, and as parliamentary assistant to the Chair of the Conseil du trésor and Minister responsible for Government Administration.

In 2007 and 2008, Pierre Moreau held the offices of Chief of staff for the Government House Leader, and as Chief of staff for the Minister of Justice and Attorney General and the Minister of Public Security.

Elected as MNA for Châteauguay in the general election held on December 8, 2008, he held the offices of Chief Government Whip from December 2008 up until February 2011. From February to September 2011, of Minister responsible for Canadian Intergovernmental Affairs and the Canadian Francophonie, and of Minister responsible for the Reform of Democratic Institutions and Access to Information. He was then appointed as Minister of Transports from September 2011 to September 2012.

Pierre Moreau was, re-elected as MNA for Châteauguay in the general election held on September 4, 2012 and appointed as Official Opposition House Leader on April 9, 2013.

On April 7, 2014, Pierre Moreau was re-elected for the third consecutive time in Châteauguay. On April 23, 2014, Philippe Couillard, named him Minister of Municipal Affairs and Land Occupancy and Minister responsible for the Montérégie region.

On January 28, 2016 he was appointed Minister of Education but was on an indefinite leave of absence since February 22 following a tumour diagnosis. Sébastien Proulx  replaced  Hélène David as Minister of Higher Education and Lucie Charlebois as responsible for Montérégie until his return to work on January 19, 2017.

Moreau was said by some pundits to be the heir apparent to the PLQ leadership until he lost his Chateauguay seat in the Quebec general election, 2018.  Moreau earned second place in the 2013 party leadership race that elected Philippe Couillard.

In December 2018, Moreau decided to not run for the leadership of the Quebec Liberal Party.

In February 2019, Moreau was appointed Managing Partner of the Bélanger Sauvé law firm based in Montreal, Quebec for which he was an Associate Partner from 1991 to 2003.

Education 
 Member of the Barreau du Québec (1981)
 Law Degree, Université Laval (1980)

Professional Experience 
 Chief of staff for the Minister of Justice and for the Minister of Public Security (2007-2008)
 Chief of staff, Government House Leader (2007)
 Public and administrative law instructor, Professional Education School of the Barreau du Québec (1996-2003)
 Partner, Bélanger Sauvé Law Firm, Montréal (1991-2003)
 Partner, Hébert Denault Delisle Law Firm (1988-1991)
 Partner, Delisle Moreau Law Firm (1981-1988)

Political, Parliamentary and Ministerial Offices 
Reelected as Member for Châteauguay in the general election held on April 7, 2014
 Minister of Education, Recreation and Sports from January 28, 2016 to February 22, 2016
 Minister of Municipal Affairs and Land Occupancy from April 23, 2014 to January 28, 2016
 Minister responsible for the Montérégie region from April 23, 2014 to February 22, 2016

Reelected as Member for Châteauguay in the general election held on September 4, 2012
 Official Opposition critic for democratic institutions from February 4, 2014 to March 5, 2014
 Member of the Committee on the National Assembly from April 9, 2013 to March 5, 2014
 Member of the Subcommittee on Parliamentary Reform from April 9, 2013 to March 5, 2014
 Official Opposition House Leader from April 9, 2013 to March 5, 2014
 Member of the Québec Section, Commonwealth Parliamentary Association (CPA) from December 6, 2012 to March 5, 2014
 Member of the Québec Branch, Parliamentary Confederation of the Americas (COPA) from December 6, 2012 to March 5, 2014
 Member of the National Assembly Delegation for Relations with Bavaria (DANRBA) from December 6, 2012 to March 5, 2014
 Member of the Committee on Public Administration from November 6, 2012 to April 9, 2013
 Official Opposition critic for the Secrétariat aux affaires intergouvernementales canadiennes from September 26, 2012 to February 3, 2014

Elected as Member for Châteauguay in the general election held on December 8, 2008
 Member of Conseil du trésor from May 16, 2012 to September 19, 2012
 Member of the Comité des priorités from September 14, 2011 to September 19, 2012
 Member of the Comité des priorités économiques from September 14, 2011 to September 19, 2012
 Member of the Comité ministériel de la prospérité économique et du développement durable from September 14, 2011 to September 19, 2012
 Minister of Transport from September 7, 2011 to September 19, 2012
 Minister responsible for Canadian Intergovernmental Affairs and the Canadian Francophonie from February 3, 2011 to September 6, 2011
 Minister responsible for the Reform of Democratic Institutions and Access to Information from February 3, 2011 to September 6, 2011
 Vice-chair of the National Assembly Delegation for Relations with Catalonia (DANRC) from April 22, 2009 to February 2, 2011
 Member of the Comité ministériel du développement des régions et de l'occupation du territoire from January 15, 2009 to August 11, 2010
 Member of the Comité ministériel de la prospérité économique et du développement durable from January 15, 2009 to February 8, 2011
 Member of the Comité ministériel du développement social, éducatif et culturel from January 15, 2009 to September 19, 2012
 Member of the Comité de législation from January 15, 2009 to February 8, 2011
 Substitute member of the Office of the National Assembly from January 14, 2009 to February 2, 2011
 Chief Government Whip from December 18, 2008 to February 2, 2011
 Member of the Committee on the National Assembly from December 18, 2008 to February 3, 2011
 Member of the Subcommittee on Parliamentary Reform from December 18, 2008 to February 3, 2011

Elected as Member for Marguerite-D'Youville in the general election held on April 14, 2003
 Deputy Government House Leader from October 19, 2005 to December 22, 2005
 Member of the Committee on Public Finance from March 8, 2005 to February 21, 2007
 Parliamentary assistant to the Chair of the Conseil du trésor and Minister responsible for Government Administration from March 2, 2005 to February 21, 2007
 Member of the Committee on Culture from June 5, 2003 to February 21, 2007
 Member of the Committee on Institutions from June 5, 2003 to March 8, 2005
 Parliamentary assistant to the Minister of Justice and Attorney General from May 21, 2003 to March 2, 2005

See also 

 Member for Châteauguay
 Philippe Couillard
 Quebec Liberal Party

References

External links
 www.pierremoreau.ca — Official website
 Pierre Moreau — National Assembly of Quebec
 Pierre Moreau — Quebec Liberal Party

Living people
1957 births
Lawyers in Quebec
Quebec Liberal Party MNAs
Université Laval alumni
People from Verchères, Quebec
21st-century Canadian politicians